The 2010 Polish Speedway season was the 2010 season of motorcycle speedway in Poland.

Individual

Polish Individual Championship

Golden Helmet
The 1999 Golden Golden Helmet organised by the Polish Motor Union (PZM) was the 2010 event for the league's leading riders. The final was held at Częstochowa on the 16 September.

Junior Championship
winner - Maciej Janowski

Silver Helmet
 winner - Maciej Janowski

Bronze Helmet
 winner - Patryk Dudek

Pairs

Polish Pairs Speedway Championship
The 2010 Polish Pairs Speedway Championship was the 2010 edition of the Polish Pairs Speedway Championship, organised by the Polish Motor Union (PZM).

Final (3 June, MotoArena Toruń)

Team

Team Speedway Polish Championship
The 2010 Team Speedway Polish Championship was the 2010 edition of the Team Polish Championship. Unia Leszno won the gold medal.

Ekstraliga

Play offs

1.Liga

Play offs

2.Liga

Play offs

References

Poland Individual
Poland Team
Speedway
2010 in Polish speedway